Telewebion is an Iranian software program that is the streaming broadcaster video on demand for the Iranian IRIB organization state Television and Radio Corporation. It is available on iOS, Android and the Telewebion website and offers 60 channels live and archived.

References

External links
 

Iranian websites